Ward River may refer to:
In Australia
 Ward River (Central West Queensland)
 Ward River (Far North Queensland)

In Ireland
 Ward River (Ireland), County Meath and Fingal (County Dublin), Ireland

See also
 Wards River, New South Wales, Australia